is a 1993 Japanese youth drama television play written and directed by Shunji Iwai. The play was originally produced for the drama anthology series  and broadcast as its sixteenth episode, on August 26, 1993. It was later re-edited for a theatrical release in Japanese cinemas on August 12, 1995.

Iwai later directed a feature-length documentary about the making of the original TV play, and it was adapted into an animated film directed by Akiyuki Shinbo and a novel written by Iwai, both released in 2017.

Plot
One summer day a group of sixth-grade boys have an argument about whether fireworks are round or flat when viewed from different angles and embark on a journey for the answer during the annual firework festival. Meanwhile, one of their classmates, Nazuna, is troubled by her parents' separation and decides to choose one of the boys to run away with.

Awards
 1993 – Directors Guild of Japan New Directors Award

Adaptation
 Fireworks (2017)

References

External links
 
 

1993 television episodes
1995 films
Films directed by Shunji Iwai
Fuji TV dramas
Japanese drama films
Japanese television episodes
1990s Japanese-language films
Television anthology episodes
Television plays
Television shows adapted into films
Television shows adapted into novels
1990s Japanese films